Sidcley Ferreira Pereira (born 13 May 1993), simply known as Sidcley, is a Brazilian professional footballer who plays for CSKA 1948. Mainly a left back, he can also play as a midfielder.

Club career
Born in Vila Velha, Espírito Santo, Sidcley made his senior debuts with local Linhares. After a stint at Al-Sharjah, he returned to his homeland and signed for Grêmio Catanduvense.

Sidcley joined Atlético Paranaense in 2013, initially assigned to the under-23 squad. He made his Série A debut on 3 May 2014, replacing Nathan in a 1–0 home win against Grêmio.

In March 2015 Sidcley was loaned to Atlético Goianiense until the end of the year.

In July 2018, Sidcley signed a five year contract with the Ukrainian Premier League runners up FC Dynamo Kyiv. He made 33 appearances for Dynamo, scoring three goals and contributing three assists, while he also spent another season back on loan at Corinthians.

On 27 August 2021, PAOK announces the transfer of Sidcley Ferreira from Dynamo Kyiv on loan. The Brazilian left back will wear the number 16 shirt.

Career statistics

Honours

Club

Corinthians
Campeonato Paulista: 2018

Dynamo Kyiv
Ukrainian Premier League: 2020–21

PAOK
Super League Greece: Runner-Up 2021–22
Greek Cup: Runner-Up 2021–22

References

External links
Atlético Paranaense profile 

1993 births
Living people
People from Vila Velha
Brazilian footballers
Association football defenders
Campeonato Brasileiro Série A players
Campeonato Brasileiro Série B players
Club Athletico Paranaense players
Atlético Clube Goianiense players
Sport Club Corinthians Paulista players
Brazilian expatriate footballers
Ukrainian Premier League players
Super League Greece players
FC Dynamo Kyiv players
PAOK FC players
Cuiabá Esporte Clube players
FC CSKA 1948 Sofia players
Expatriate footballers in Ukraine
Brazilian expatriate sportspeople in Ukraine
Expatriate footballers in Greece
Brazilian expatriate sportspeople in Greece
Expatriate footballers in Bulgaria
Brazilian expatriate sportspeople in Bulgaria
Sportspeople from Espírito Santo